Great and Little Plumstead is a civil parish in the English county of Norfolk consisting of the villages of Great Plumstead, Little Plumstead and Thorpe End. The first two villages have been known as Plumstead Magna and Plumstead Parva respectively.

The name 'Plumstead' means 'plum-tree place', probably in the sense of a copse .

For the purposes of local government, it falls within the district of Broadland.

Sir Robert Illey had the manor of Plumstead Parva. He died in 1398 but he and his wife Katherine Gymyngham had a daughter Sibylle who was a literary patron.

Little Plumstead Hospital 

Little Plumstead Hospital at Little Plumstead is a learning disability hospital founded in 1930. It is run by Hertfordshire Partnership NHS Foundation Trust, and formerly provided a large amount of employment for the villages. The majority of the site has been sold off for new housing developments, with two wards remaining, the Broadland Clinic and Astley Court.

The Walled Garden Community Shop and Cafe 

The Walled Garden Community Shop and Cafe is a business set in a Victorian Walled Garden in Little Plumstead. It is run as a community benefit society.

References 

http://kepn.nottingham.ac.uk/map/place/Norfolk/Great%20and%20Little%20Plumstead

External links

SS Protase & Gervase on the European Round Tower Churches website

Civil parishes in Norfolk
Broadland